Crosstown traffic may refer to:

 Crosstown traffic, the phenomenon of gridlocking in New York City and other places
"Crosstown Traffic" (song), a 1968 song by The Jimi Hendrix Experience
Crosstown Traffic, a television show starring Aries Spears
Crosstown Traffic: Jimi Hendrix and Post-War Pop, a biography by Charles Shaar Murray
Crosstown Traffic (film), a 1995 American TV movie

See also
Crosstime Traffic, a book series by Harry Turtledove